The Wenxi West railway station  is a railway station of Datong–Xi'an Passenger Railway that is located in Wenxi County, Shanxi, China. It started operation on July 1, 2014, together with the Railway.

Railway stations in Shanxi
Railway stations in China opened in 2014